Little Carp River may refer to the following streams in the U.S. state of Michigan:

 Little Carp River (Baraga County), on the Keweenaw Peninsula flowing into L'Anse Bay of Lake Superior
 Little Carp River (Cheboygan County), also called Carp River and Carp Creek
 Little Carp River (Gogebic-Ontonagon counties), flowing into Lake Superior less than one mile west of the mouth of the Carp River (Gogebic-Ontonagon counties) near the Porcupine Mountains

See also 
 Carp River (disambiguation)